The Aramaic Inscription of Taxila is an inscription on a piece of marble, originally belonging to an octagonal column, discovered by Sir John Marshall in 1915 at Taxila, British India. The inscription is written in Aramaic, probably by the Indian emperor Ashoka around 260 BCE, and often categorized as one of the Minor Rock Edicts. Since Aramaic was the official language of the Achaemenid empire, which disappeared in 330 BCE with the conquests of Alexander the Great, it seems that this inscription was addressed directly to the populations of this ancient empire still present in northwestern India, or to border populations for which Aramaic remained the normal communication language. The inscription is known as KAI 273.

Related inscriptions
The discovery of this inscription was followed by that of several other inscriptions in Aramaic or Greek (or both), written by Asoka. The most famous are the Kandahar Bilingual Rock Inscription, written in Greek and Aramaic, or the Kandahar Greek Edict of Ashoka, also found in Kandahar. In 1932 another inscription in Aramaic was discovered in the Laghman Valley at Pul-i-Darunteh, then in 1963 an inscription in "Indo-Aramaic" alternating the Indian language and the Aramaic language, but using only the Aramaic script, the Aramaic parts translating the Indian parts transcribed in the Aramaic alphabet, also found in Kandahar. Finally, another inscription was found in Laghman, the Aramaic Inscription of Laghman.

Text of the inscription
The text of the inscription is very fragmentary, but it has been established that it contains twice, lines 9 and 12, the mention of MR'N PRYDRŠ ("our lord Priyadasi"), the characteristic title used by Ashoka.

See also 

 List of Edicts of Ashoka

References 

3rd-century BC works
Archaeology in Pakistan
Edicts of Ashoka
Aramaic inscriptions
KAI inscriptions